Celia Brooks (born 1969) is a vegetarian chef, author and television host from the United States who lives in London. The "Brown" in her name was dropped after divorce in 2010. 

Brooks was born in Colorado. She was pursuing a career as a director of plays when she moved to England in 1989 and went on to establish a food tour company Gastrotours in 2002. She has written nine vegetarian cookbooks and has appeared on the Saturday Kitchen and Good Food Live television shows.

Selected publications

Vegetarian Foodscape (1998)
Entertaining Vegetarians (2003)
New Kitchen Garden: Organic Gardening with Herbs, Vegetables and Fruit (with Adam Caplin, 2003)
World Vegetarian Classics (2005)
New Urban Farmer (2010)
5:2 Vegetarian (2014)
Low-Carb & Gluten-Free Vegetarian (2014)
SuperVeg: The Joy and Power of the 25 Healthiest Vegetables on the Planet (2018)

References

1969 births
Living people
American emigrants to England
American television hosts
American vegetarianism activists
American women chefs
American women television presenters
American women writers
BBC television presenters
English women writers
Gluten-free cookbook writers
Organic gardeners
People from Colorado
Vegetarian cookbook writers
Women cookbook writers